Leigh Eddings (30 September 1937 – 28 February 2007; née Judith Leigh Schall), was the wife of David Eddings and co-author of many of his later works and uncredited co-author of his early works, and married him 27 October 1962.

Biography
Born Judith Leigh Schall in Westmoreland County, Pennsylvania, USA, she met Eddings in Seattle. According to her husband she was part Choctaw.

She had been in the Air Force and had been described by her husband as a world-class cook, a highly skilled fisherwoman and an excellent markswoman.

Leigh married David Eddings in 1962, and adopted one boy in 1966, Scott David. They adopted a younger girl between 1966 and 1969. In 1969 they lost custody of both children and each were sentenced to a year in jail from separate trials after pleading guilty to child abuse.  Though the nature of the abuse, the trial and the sentencing were all extensively reported in South Dakota newspapers at the time, these details of the Eddings' life never resurfaced during their later successful joint career as fantasy authors, only reappearing several years after both had died.

After both served their sentences, David and Leigh Eddings moved to Denver in 1971, where David found work in a grocery store.

She co-authored High Hunt (1973) with David, and all of David's subsequent books, but was not credited as a co-author until the publication of Belgarath the Sorcerer in 1995. It was Lester del Rey who believed that multi-authorships were a problem and that it would be better if David Edding's name alone appeared on the books.

Suffering a series of strokes, Leigh died 28 February 2007 in Carson City, Nevada.

References

External links 
 Interview with Mr. and Mrs. Eddings at sffworld.com
 

American fantasy writers
Women science fiction and fantasy writers
American women novelists
1931 births
2007 deaths
20th-century American novelists
American people of Choctaw descent
People from Westmoreland County, Pennsylvania
21st-century American novelists
20th-century American women writers
21st-century American women writers
Novelists from Pennsylvania